Basswood is an unincorporated community located in the town of Eagle, Richland County, Wisconsin, United States. The area's original post office, which opened in August 1869, was named Lucas in honor of farmer James Lucas. Later that year, the name was changed to Bass Wood and was changed again to Basswood in 1892.

References

Unincorporated communities in Richland County, Wisconsin
Unincorporated communities in Wisconsin